Samastha Kerala Sunni Students Federation, abbreviated as the S.K.S.S.F, is the student wing of Samastha Kerala Jem-iyyathul Ulama (E. K. Group), the principal Sunni-Shafi'i scholarly body in Kerala.

The organisation is headquartered at Kozhikode.

Organs 

 Magazine —  Sathyadhara
 Voluntary wing — Viqaya
 Students Union — Twalaba 
 Humanitarian agency — Sahachari
 Education and Career - Trend
 Campus Wing
 Worship and Faith - Ibad Wing
 Isthiqama:
 Maneesha
 Organet 
 Arts wing - Sargalaya
 Media wing
 Meem

See also
 Sunni Students' Federation
 Muslim Students Federation
 Kerala State Muslim Students Federation

References

External links

 Samastha Kerala Sunni Students Federation

Sunni organizations
Islam in Kerala
Sunni Islam in India
Organizations established in 1989
Student organisations in India
1989 establishments in Kerala
Islamic organisations based in India
Member organizations of the Sunni Students Council
Islamic youth organizations